Computer Graphics International (CGI) is one of the oldest annual international conferences on computer graphics. It is organized by the Computer Graphics Society (CGS). Researchers across the whole world are invited to share their experiences and novel achievements in various fields - like computer graphics and human-computer interaction. Former conferences have been held recently in Geneva (virtually), Calgary, Canada, Bintan, Indonesia and Yokohama, Japan.

Awards 

Starting in the year of 2013, CGI has given yearly a Best Paper Award and a Career Achievement Award.

Venues

Computer graphics
Human–computer interaction
Computer graphics conferences